Brailey is a surname. Notable people with the surname include:

Jayden Brailey (born 1996), Australian rugby league footballer
Jerome Brailey (born 1950), American drummer
Jimmy Brailey (1919–1981), Australian rugby league player
Miriam Esther Brailey (1900–1976), American physician
Theodore Ronald Brailey, (1887–1912), English pianist on the RMS Titanic who died in the disaster
Kenneth Brailey Cumberland (1913–2011), New Zealand geography academic

See also

Bailey (disambiguation)
Baily (disambiguation)
Baley (disambiguation)
Brail
Braley
Braly (disambiguation)
Briley (disambiguation)